Jessonda is a grand opera (Große Oper) by Louis Spohr, written in 1822.

Spohr had been newly appointed Hofkapellmeister in Kassel.

Performance history
The first performance was at the Kurfürstliches Hoftheater in Kassel on 28 July 1823 under the direction of the composer.

This opera was performed regularly up to about 1860. While the overture to Jessonda may be heard today in concert performance, the opera itself no longer holds the place it once did in the operatic repertoire.

In February 1980, the Oxford University Opera Club performed this opera in the Oxford Playhouse.

Roles

Synopsis
In this opera the heroine, Jessonda, widow of the Rajah, must be burned to death on his funeral pyre. Before her marriage she had been in love with a Portuguese general. A young Brahmin, Nadori, is sent from the Hindu temple to bring Jessonda the order for her death, as dictated by their customs. However, he falls in love with her sister, Amazili.  

The Portuguese forces that are camped outside the city are led by Tristan d'Acunha, who has sworn that Indian customs will be preserved. Nadori has vowed to save Jessonda and Tristan now discovers that she is his long lost love. The Indian breach of the truce allows Tristan to act and Jessonda is rescued in the nick of time, before Dandau, the chief Brahmin, can carry out the intended sacrifice.

Notes

Further reading
Louis Spohr: A Critical Biography by Clive Brown , Cambridge University Press (1984)

External links

Operas
Operas by Louis Spohr
Romantische Opern
German-language operas
1823 operas
Operas set in India
Operas based on plays